Karfaleh (also known as Karfaleh-ye Yek, Karfaleh-ye ‘Olyā, and Kerfeleh-ye ‘Olyā) is a village in Shurab Rural District, Veysian District, Dowreh County, Lorestan Province, Iran. At the 2006 census, its population was 75, in 20 families.

References 

Towns and villages in Dowreh County